Siena College of San Jose, also referred to by its acronym SCSJ, is a private Catholic basic and higher education institution, owned and administered by the Congregation of the Dominican Sisters of St. Catherine of Siena, located in San Jose del Monte, Bulacan, Philippines. It is a sister school of other Siena Colleges, such as Siena College of Taytay and Siena College of Quezon City.

History and present

The institution was founded in 1988. Initially, only the St. Thomas Aquinas building was present. Eventually, this grew into four buildings, each of which is delegated into four departments: The Our Lady of the Rosary  building for the college department, the St. Thomas Aquinas building for the pre-elementary and elementary departments, the St. Dominic de Guzman building for the junior high school department, and the St. Catherine of Siena building for the senior high school department, of which is the namesake of the institution. The Mother Francisca hall, constructed during 1997, is where many of the school's events and masses are held.

Its main campus is located in Siena Heights, within San Jose del Monte. The institution formerly had an annex building for its college department, which is no longer in use. The building remains abandoned along Quirino Highway, in front of Pleasant Hills Subdivision.

Basic education programs 
Siena College of San Jose offers the standard K–12 Philippine curriculum implemented in 2013. It currently has the Night high school program, offering scholarships to students starting Grade 7 up until they graduate from Grade 10, providing a Catholic education for the less fortunate. Night high school students pay a minimal tuition fee in comparison to regular students. Classes are held in the afternoon and are shorter in length than regular students; summer classes are held to make up for the shorter class periods. Previously, students in the night high school program would have to take an extra year of high school instead.

References 

Schools in the Philippines
Catholic schools
Catholic schools in the Philippines